Gerald J. Comeau  (born February 1, 1946) is a Canadian retired Senator and politician.

Early life
Born in Meteghan Station, Nova Scotia, Comeau is an accountant by training. Comeau received his B.Comm and his B.Ed from the Université de Moncton.

Comeau is a member of Nova Scotia's Acadian minority.

Political career
He was elected to the House of Commons of Canada as part of the Progressive Conservative (PC) landslide win in the 1984 election. The Member of Parliament for South West Nova, Nova Scotia, Comeau was a government backbencher throughout his term and was defeated in the 1988 election due in part to the unpopularity of the Canada–United States Free Trade Agreement in Atlantic Canada.

In 1990, Comeau was appointed to the Senate by Governor General Ray Hnatyshyn, on the advice of Prime Minister Brian Mulroney. He sat as a Progressive Conservative until February 2004. He has been a Conservative Party senator since the merger of the PC Party into that party. He served as Deputy Leader of the Government in the Senate from February 23, 2006, to May 24, 2011.

On January 19, 2013, Governor-General David Johnston, on the advice of Prime Minister Stephen Harper, appointed Comeau to the Queen's Privy Council for Canada.

Comeau retired from the Senate on November 30, 2013 - seven years before reaching the mandatory retirement age of 75.

Electoral record

References

External links
 

1946 births
Living people
Acadian people
Canadian senators from Nova Scotia
Conservative Party of Canada senators
Progressive Conservative Party of Canada senators
Members of the House of Commons of Canada from Nova Scotia
Members of the King's Privy Council for Canada
Progressive Conservative Party of Canada MPs
People from Digby County, Nova Scotia
Université de Moncton alumni
21st-century Canadian politicians